The Leggett House is a historic house in rural northern White County, Arkansas. It is a single story structure, built out of horizontal wooden planking, nailed to 4x4 posts at the corners. It is topped by a gable roof and set on stone piers. A box-construction addition extends to the east, and a shed roof porch extends across the southern facade. The house, built about 1870, is the only known plank-framed house in the county.

The house was listed on the National Register of Historic Places in 1992.

See also
National Register of Historic Places listings in White County, Arkansas

References

Houses on the National Register of Historic Places in Arkansas
Houses in White County, Arkansas
National Register of Historic Places in White County, Arkansas
1870 establishments in Arkansas
Houses completed in 1870